Ostrec (Macedonian Cyrillic: Острец) is a village in the municipality of Bitola, North Macedonia. The village is about 12 kilometers away from Bitola, North Macedonia. It used to be part of the former municipality of Bistrica.

Culture 
Ostrec has traditionally and exclusively been populated by Ghegs, a northern subgroup of Albanians and speak the Gheg Albanian dialect, similar to the Matjan and Dibran Geg subdialects.

Demographics
Due to emigration in the 1960-1970s, a sizable diaspora from the village exists in the mainly Western Suburbs of Melbourne, Australia. As well as a very large number have settled  in Chicago,  Florida and New York, U.S.,  with a smaller number in Toronto, Canada.

Those settlements took place generally after the Second World War starting in the 1950s, '60s, continuing through the '70s, '80s, and beyond,    However a very large number of Albanians from Ostrec immigrated in the early 1900s to Turkish cities such as Izmir and Istanbul. Other places that people from Ostrec have settled are central Albania, Tirana and Kavaja as well as the Village of Kalush near Kavaja.

As of the 2021 census, Ostrec had 161 residents with the following ethnic composition:
Albanians 154
Persons for whom data are taken from administrative sources 7

According to the 2002 census, the village had a total of 229 inhabitants. Ethnic groups in the village include:
Albanians 228

References

External links

Villages in Bitola Municipality
Albanian communities in North Macedonia